Rebecca James (born 1970 in Sydney, Australia) is a writer of young adult fiction.

Biography
Rebecca spent her early twenties working as a waitress, her late twenties teaching English in Indonesia and Japan, and most of her thirties having babies and working as a kitchen designer.

She has started several university degrees but has yet to place any letters after her name. Despite her highly developed procrastinatory skills she has somehow managed to finish writing a book or two - and plans to spend her forties, fifties, sixties, seventies, eighties and nineties finishing several more.

She lives in Australia with her partner and their five children.

Novels
 Beautiful Malice, published by Bantam Books in 2010.
Sweet Damage, published by Allen & Unwin in 2013.
Cooper Bartholomew is Dead, published by Allen & Unwin in 2014.
The Woman in the Mirror, published by HarperCollins HQ in 2018.

Pre-publication media interest
The Wall Street Journal wrote an article on 23 October 2009 asking whether James could be 'The Next JK Rowling.' It also said, of Beautiful Malice, that it 'isn't merely to be published, but has become a publishing phenomenon that is sparking an aggressive bidding war worldwide.'

In April 2010, The Bookseller ran an interview with James, in which the interviewer describes the novel as having 'strong international appeal.'

References

External links

 Rebecca's page, Conville and Walsh literary agents
 Official website

Australian children's writers
Australian writers of young adult literature
1970 births
Living people
Australian women writers
Women writers of young adult literature